Lake Cole is an ice-covered lake  long, located south of Mount Ewart and Mount Melania on Black Island in the Ross Archipelago. It was named by the Advisory Committee on Antarctic Names (1999) after J.W. Cole, Department of Geology, Victoria University of Wellington, who, with A. Ewart, investigated the geology of Brown Peninsula, Black Island, and Cape Bird in the 1964–65 season.

References 

Lakes of the Ross Dependency
Black Island (Ross Archipelago)